This is a list of songs that are typically played during graduation ceremonies.

Popular traditional graduation songs by country or region
Europe: Gaudeamus Igitur
Latin America: Triumphal March from Aida
Japan: Hotaru no hikari (Uses the same tune as "Auld Lang Syne)."
Japan: Aogeba tōtoshi.
The Philippines: Triumphal March from Aida, Pomp and Circumstance Marches
Taiwan: Auld Lang Syne
US and Canada: Pomp and Circumstance Marches
Sweden: Den blomstertid nu kommer, I denna ljuva sommartid, Studentsången

Modern (20th century or later) graduation songs
Graduation (Friends Forever), a song by Vitamin C
10nen Sakura, a song by the Japanese idol group AKB48 released in 2009.
”When We Were Friends” a song by Adam Fecht and Elizabeth Swearingen released in 2018 has received over 500,000 hits on YouTube.
Unwritten, a song by Natasha Bedingfield.
Я смотрю на них by Tarakany!

References

Lists of songs
Education-related lists
Song forms